Daowai District is one of nine districts of the prefecture-level city of Harbin, the capital of Heilongjiang Province, Northeast China, forming part of the city's urban core. It borders the districts of Hulan to the north, Acheng to the southeast, Xiangfang to the south, Nangang to the southwest, Songbei to the west, as well as Bin County to the east.

Administrative divisions
There are 23 subdistricts and 4 towns in the district:

Subdistricts

Towns

See also

References

External links
  Government site - 

Daowai